Synthemis is a genus of dragonflies in the family Synthemistidae.
Species of Synthemis are medium-sized, slender, black and yellow dragonflies.

Species
The genus includes these species:

Gallery

References

Synthemistidae
Anisoptera genera
Odonata of Australia
Taxa named by Edmond de Sélys Longchamps